Senate elections were held in Kazakhstan on 8 October 2002. All the 16 represented seats in the Senate were elected by 3304 out of 3153 mäslihat members.

Electoral system 
The members of the Senate of Kazakhstan are nonpartisan and are indirectly elected by the local legislative bodies Maslihats every six years. Each region and cities of Almaty and Astana are represented by two senators while 7 senators are appointed by the President of Kazakhstan.

References

Kazakhstan
Elections in Kazakhstan
2002 in Kazakhstan
October 2002 events in Asia